Rein Smit (born 5 January 2001) is a Dutch professional footballer who plays as a forward for Telstar.

Career

Heerenveen
Smit played youth football for amateur clubs FC Castricum and ADO '20. In 2014, he was scouted to the youth academy of SC Heerenveen. He made his professional debut in the first team on 21 December 2019 in a 1–1 draw at home against Heracles Almelo. He came on as a substitute for Anders Dreyer in the 79th minute.

Telstar
On 20 July 2021, Smit signed with Eerste Divisie club Telstar. That same evening he made his unofficial debut against Quick Boys in pre-season. He also scored his first goal in the 63rd minute in that match. He made his official debut on 6 August in a 1–1 draw against FC Emmen at home at BUKO Stadion. On 10 September, Smit scored his first goal in the 72nd minute of the league match against Almere City and thereby secured a 1–1 draw after having come on as a substitute for Cas Dijkstra in the 58th minute.

References

External links

2001 births
Living people
People from Castricum
Footballers from North Holland
Dutch footballers
Association football forwards
SC Heerenveen players
SC Telstar players
Eredivisie players
Eerste Divisie players